Prenton High School for Girls is an academy school for girls between the ages of 11 and 16 in Rock Ferry, Birkenhead, Wirral, England.

Overview
This school is smaller than average and serves approximately 750 female students in an area of significant social and economic disadvantage. About one-third of students are selected for grammar school education. The school became a specialist college for science, maths and the visual arts in July 2007. The school converted to academy status in August 2011.

The school is divided into three houses, each defined by its own colour: Bedford (green), Hesketh (yellow) and Riviera (red).

Performance
In October 2007 and 2010/2011 the school was described as "an outstanding school" and received ratings of good or excellent in all areas rated by the Ofsted inspection team.

References

External links
 Prenton High School homepage
 Ofsted - Preston High School for Girls
 Secondary School (GCSE and equivalent) Achievement and Attainment Tables 2006

Academies in the Metropolitan Borough of Wirral
Schools in Birkenhead
Girls' schools in Merseyside
Secondary schools in the Metropolitan Borough of Wirral